Yeniköy is a village in the Gümüşhacıköy District, Amasya Province, Turkey. Its population is 131 (2021). In 2008 it passed from the Hamamözü District to the Gümüşhacıköy District.

References

Villages in Gümüşhacıköy District